Windeyer is a rural locality in the Blackall-Tambo Region, Queensland, Australia.

Road infrastructure
The Landsborough Highway passes to the south-west.

References 

Blackall-Tambo Region
Localities in Queensland